The Fuentemolinos cave is the largest formation in a cave complex, consisting of at least twelve cavities, in the town of Puras de Villafranca belonging to the municipality of Belorado (Burgos, Spain).

It has been mapped within recorded a total of 4086 meters.

Its current visit is regulated and is the subject of adventure travel.

References

Geography of the Province of Burgos
Caves of Spain
Landforms of Castile and León